The 1996–97 UC Irvine Anteaters men's basketball team represented the University of California, Irvine during the 1996–97 NCAA Division I men's basketball season. The Anteaters were led by sixth year head coach Rod Baker and played at the Bren Events Center and were members of the Big West Conference. They finished with the worst record in school history and Rod Baker was dismissed as head coach at the end of the season.

Previous season 
The 1995–96 UC Irvine Anteaters men's basketball team finished the season with a record of 15–12, 11–7 in Big West play.

Roster

Schedule

|-
!colspan=9 style=|Regular Season

Source

Awards and honors
Brian Johnson
Big West All-Freshman Team 
Juma Jackson
Big West All-Freshman Team 
Andrew Carlson
Big West All-Freshman Team

Source:

References

UC Irvine Anteaters men's basketball seasons
UC Irvine
UC Irvine Anteaters
UC Irvine Anteaters